File Under Ramones is a Ramones tribute album by the Huntingtons released in 1999 on Tooth & Nail Records.

Track listing
All songs written by Ramones, except for R.A.M.O.N.E.S. (Motörhead).
 "Durango 95"
 "Havana Affair"
 "Poison Heart"
 "Chainsaw"
 "She's A Sensation"
 "I Believe In Miracles"
 "Gimme Gimme Shock Treatment"
 "I Don't Wanna Walk Around With You"
 "Today Your Love, Tomorrow The World"
 "Loudmouth"
 "I Don't Care"
 "Pet Sematary"
 "Bonzo Goes to Bitburg"
 "Now I Wanna Be A Good Boy"
 "Why Is It Always This Way?"
 "I Remember You"
 "Strength To Endure"
 "I Don't Wanna Go Down To The Basement"
 "Commando"
 "Life's A Gas / R.A.M.O.N.E.S."

Personnel
 Mikey Huntington – Vocals/Bass
 Cliffy Huntington – Guitar/Vocals
 Mikee Huntington – Drums
 C. J. Huntington – Guitar
Terry Holt – harmony vocals
Nicky Rotundo – guitar solos on track 3
Richie Murphy – additional handclaps
Nicky Rotundo – engineer
Brandon Ebel – executive productcer

References

The Huntingtons albums
1999 albums
Tooth & Nail Records albums
Ramones tribute albums